FK Polet is a Serbian football club based in Trbušani, Serbia.

Polet Trbusani